Shrub Oak is an unincorporated hamlet and census-designated place (CDP) located in the town of Yorktown in Westchester County, New York, United States. The population was 2,011 at the 2010 census.

Geography
Shrub Oak is located at  (41.330178, -73.829736).

Demographics

At the 2000 census there were 1,812 people, 601 households, and 495 families residing in the hamlet (of Yorktown). The population density was 1,127.3 per square mile (434.5/km). There were 612 housing units at an average density of 380.8/sq mi (146.8/km).  The racial makeup of the hamlet was 93.16% White, 2.21% African American, 0.39% Native American, 1.16% Asian, 1.93% from other races, and 1.16% from two or more races. Hispanic or Latino of any race were 8.66%.

Of the 601 households, 45.6% had children under the age of 18 living with them, 68.6% were married couples living together, 8.5% had a female householder with no husband present, and 17.5% were non-families. 14.1% of households were one person, and 5.5% were one person aged 65 or older. The average household size was 3.01 and the average family size was 3.35.

In the hamlet the population was spread out, with 29.4% under the age of 18, 6.5% from 18 to 24, 31.3% from 25 to 44, 24.2% from 45 to 64, and 8.6% 65 or older. The median age was 36 years. For every 100 females, there were 95.7 males. For every 100 females age 18 and over, there were 95.9 males.

The median household income was $80,108 and the median family income was $87,226. Males had a median income of $59,432 versus $36,523 for females. The per capita income for the hamlet was $29,499. About 2.2% of families and 2.4% of the population were below the poverty line, including 4.3% of those under age 18 and none of those age 65 or over.

Shrub Oak in literature
The writer Clifford A. Pickover has used Shrub Oak as a backdrop in several of his books, including Sex, Drugs, Einstein and Elves, "Liquid Earth (Neoreality Series)" and A Beginner's Guide to Immortality.  Pickover has written fifty books.

The stamp collector, philatelic writer and dealer, Herman Herst lived in Shrub Oak, which he mentions in many of his writings. He also set up a local post in Shrub Oak.

T. C. Boyle uses Shrub Oak as setting for his short story "All Shook Up".

References

Census-designated places in New York (state)
Hamlets in New York (state)
Yorktown, New York